Of Course, the Motorists is a 1959 West German comedy film directed by Erich Engels and starring Heinz Erhardt, Maria Perschy and Erik Schumann.

The film's sets were designed by the art director Walter Haag.

Cast
 Heinz Erhardt as PHW Eberhard Dobermann
 Maria Perschy as Karin Dobermann
 Erik Schumann as Walter Schliewen
 Ruth Stephan as Jutta Schmalbach
 Trude Herr as Frau Rumberg, Fahrlehrerin
 Margitta Scherr as Gisela
 Edith Hancke as Autofahrerin
 Arne Madin as Felix Dobermann
 Ralf Wolter as Oberwachtmeister
 Willy Maertens as Film-Regisseur
 Bob Iller as Quizmeister
 Hans Paetsch as Polizeipräsident
 Jöns Andersson as Jugendlicher (Nr. 3)
 Klaus Behrendt as Toningenieur beim Polizeifest
 Peter Frankenfeld as Karl Bierbaum
 Frank Duval as Singer
 Geschwister Duval as Gesang
 María Duval as Singer
 Friedel Hensch und die Cyprys as Gesang
 Karl-Heinz Gerdesmann as 2. LKW-Fahrer
 Max Giese as Moderator beim Polizeifest
 Klaus Hellmold
 Martin Hirthe as Baurat Welker
 Günther Jerschke as 1. LKW-Fahrer
 Dieter Neckritz as Mann
 Norbert Skalden as Fahrlehrer
 Günther Ungeheuer as Verkehrspolizist

References

Bibliography 
 Hake, Sabine. German National Cinema. Routledge, 2013.

External links 
 

1959 films
1959 comedy films
German comedy films
West German films
1950s German-language films
Films directed by Erich Engels
1950s German films